Gudow is a municipality in the district of Lauenburg, in Schleswig-Holstein, Germany.

History
Since 1470 the Bülow family owns the estate and manor house of Gudow, to this day.

Between 1982 and 1990 Gudow served as West German inner German border crossing for cars travelling along Bundesautobahn 24 between the East German Democratic Republic, or West Berlin and the West German Federal Republic of Germany. The traffic was subject to the Interzonal traffic regulations, that between West Germany and West Berlin followed the special regulations of the Transit Agreement (1972).

See also
Gudow-Sterley

References

Municipalities in Schleswig-Holstein
Inner German border
Herzogtum Lauenburg